Imran Hussain (born 21 May 1981) is an Indian politician and a member of the Seventh Legislative Assembly of Delhi in India. He represents the Ballimaran constituency of 
Delhi and is a member of the Aam Aadmi Party political party. He has been inducted in the Delhi Cabinet as a Minister of Food and Civil Supplies and Election.

Early life and education
Imran Hussain was born in New Delhi. He comes from the walled city area of Delhi. He studied at Crescent School in Daryaganj. He attended the Jamia Millia Islamia and attained Bachelor of Business Studies degree. Then he joined the family garment business after completing his Bachelor of Business Studies degree. Since early age, he had been very active in spreading social and political awareness among the oppressed and under privileged people especially in the walled city. He tried his best as a youth leader to impart social justice to the needy people.

Political career
Imran Hussain contested and won the councillor elections from Ballimaran from Rashtriya Lok Dal political Party in April 2012. He represented the Ballimaran constituency in the Delhi Legislative Assembly after winning 2015 Delhi Legislative Assembly elections and is a member of the Aam Aadmi Party political party. He was inducted into the Delhi Cabinet as a Minister of Food and Civil Supplies and Election on 18 October 2015. He was re-elected in the 2020 Delhi Legislative Assembly election and became an MLA in the Sixth Legislative Assembly of Delhi.

Since February 3 2020, he is a Member of the Seventh Legislative Assembly of Delhi.

Cabinet Minister, Delhi
He is a cabinet minister in the Third Kejriwal ministry and holds the charge of below listed departments of the Government of Delhi.
 Food Supplies 
 Forest
 Elections

Electoral performance

External links
Imran Hussain Facebook
Imran Hussain Twitter
Imran Hussain Instagram

References

 

 
  

 

1981 births
Aam Aadmi Party MLAs from Delhi
Delhi MLAs 2015–2020
Delhi MLAs 2020–2025
Living people
People from New Delhi
Former members of Bahujan Samaj Party
Jamia Millia Islamia alumni